The Chapel Island Formation is a sedimentary formation from the Burin Peninsula, Newfoundland, Canada.

Stratigraphy
The formation's sequence stratigraphy is detailed in a journal article by Myrow and Hiscott. The formation starts in an intertidal zone, then, as the Cambrian progresses, becomes deeper water (outer shelf) as a general trend.

The Chapel Island Formation lies on top of the Rencontre Formation and below the Random Formation. Small shelly fossils have been recovered – primitive taxa only. The setting is nearshore or open shelf.

Subdivisions 
The formation is divided into six members, numbered 1 to 5, with Member 2 split into 2A and 2B.

References

Further reading 

An overview of the formation's sedimentology and facies is available in Narbonne, G. M., Myrow, P. M., Landing, E., and Anderson, M. M. (1987). A candidate stratotype for the Precambrian-Cambrian boundary, Fortune Head, Burin Peninsula, southeastern Newfoundland, Canadian Journal of Earth Sciences, 24, pp. 1277–1293.

Stratigraphy of Canada
Cambrian south paleopolar deposits